Sonia Petrovna (name also credited as Petrova and Petrowa) (born 13 January 1952) is a French dancer and actress (film, television and theatre). Petrovna was born in Paris. Between the age of 6 and 14 she studied dance at the Paris Opera Ballet (Ballet de l'Opéra de Paris) and on the initial invitation of Roland Petit went on to appear in various ballet productions. Her most famous early acting roles were those of Vanina Abati in La prima notte di quiete, acting alongside leading French actor Alain Delon, and as Princess Sophie in Ludwig alongside leading actors Helmut Berger, John Moulder Brown and Romy Schneider, both in 1972.

Selected filmography
 Adolescence (1966)
 Le feu sacré (1972)
 La prima notte di quiete (1972)
 Ludwig (1972)
 Di mamma non ce n'è una sola (1974)
 Amore (1974)
 Un hombre como los demás (1974)
 D'Annunzio (1985)
 Les nouveaux tricheurs (1987)
 La posta in gioco (1988)
 Da domani (1989)
 Obbligo di giocare - Zugzwang (1989)
 Innocence (II) (2004)

Television
France and Italy:
 The Legendary Life of Ernest Hemingway (1988)
 Le prime foglie d'autunno (1988)
 La casa del sortilegio (1989)
 Due madri (1990)
 The Fatal Image (Meurtre en video) (1990)
 Le Signe du Pouvoir (1992)
 Il segno del comando (1992)
 Boulevard ossements (1993) 
 "La crim'" Le sang d'une étoile (2001)
 Sous le soleil (2007)

United States:
 Search for Tomorrow (09/1979 - 09/1980) 
 The Edge of Night (09/1980 - 10/1981) 
 The Greatest American Hero (series) 
 Tucker's Witch (series)

External links
 Sonia Petrovna Official Website (in French and English)
 

1952 births
Living people
French film actresses